The 2021 EFL Trophy Final (known for sponsorship reasons as the 2021 Papa John's Trophy Final) was a football match that was played at Wembley Stadium. It decided the winners of the 2020–21 EFL Trophy, the 37th edition of the competition, a knock-out tournament for the 48 teams in League One and League Two and 16 category one academy sides. The match was played on 14 March 2021, one day after the final for the previous tournament, which was postponed due to the COVID-19 pandemic.  Although no fans were present, supporters raised money for local initiatives through virtual ticket sales.

Route to the final

Sunderland

Tranmere Rovers

Match

References

2021
Events at Wembley Stadium
2021 Trophy Final
Efl Trophy Final
Efl Trophy Final 2021
Efl Trophy Final 2021
Efl Trophy Final 2021